The Sumario Compendioso was the first mathematics book published in the New World. The book was published in Mexico City in 1556 by a clergyman Juan Diez.

Availability

The book has been digitized and is available on the Internet.

Before the Digital Age the only four known surviving copies were preserved at the Huntington Library, San Marino, California, the British Library, London, Duke University Library, and the University of Salamanca in Spain.

Excerpts

In his book The Math Book, Clifford A. Pickover provided the following information about Sumario Compendioso:

References

External links
Open Library
 HathiTrust
 JSTOR
 Archive.org

Mathematics books
1556 books